Dapoli Assembly constituency is one of the 288 Vidhan Sabha (Legislative Assembly) constituencies of Maharashtra state in western India.

Overview
Dapoli constituency is one of the five Vidhan Sabha constituencies located in Ratnagiri district.

Before the delimitation of the parliamentary constituencies in 2008, Dapoli was part of the Ratnagiri Lok Sabha constituency. After the delimitation, it became part of the Raigad Lok Sabha constituency along with five other Vidhan Sabha segments, namely Guhagar in the Ratnagiri district and  Pen, Alibag, Shrivardhan and Mahad in the Raigad district.

Members of Legislative Assembly

Election results

General elections 2019

General elections 2014

General elections 2009

See also
 Dapoli
 List of constituencies of Maharashtra Vidhan Sabha

References

Assembly constituencies of Maharashtra
Ratnagiri district